Paul Madden may refer to:
Paul Madden (chemist) (born 1948), British chemist
Paul Madden (diplomat) (born 1959), British diplomat